Barolo Boys. The Story of a Revolution is a 2014 documentary film about the story of a group of young winemakers (after called the Barolo Boys) who in the 1980s and '90s dramatically changed the world of Barolo wine, in the Langhe, north-western Italy.
In December 2014 documentary won the DOC Wine Travel Food Prize 2014, for the best film on wine and food themes.

The film depicts the last thirty years of technical innovations and changes in the story of Barolo, a red wine produced from Nebbiolo grapes, almost unknown until the 1970s (apart from its land of origin, an area of 11 communes in the Langhe) and now considered one of the best red wines in the world.
This is partly due to the work and innovations of the Barolo Boys, or Modernists, who introduced a series of technical innovations in the world of Italian wine.

The film focuses on these innovations, and the contrasts that derived from these changes, but also depicts the friendship and spirit of the group behind these producers and their success.
The documentary is filmed in the Langhe landscape, which has recently become Unesco World Heritage Site.

Film festivals
 Winner of DOC Wine Travel Food Prize 2014
 Official Selection Vancouver Film Festival 2015
 Official Selection Wine Country Film Festival 2014
 Official Selection Overlook Festival, Rome
 Official Selection Kinookus Festival, Croatia
 Official Selection Corto e Fieno Festival

References

External links 
 
 

2014 films
2014 documentary films
Documentary films about wine
Italian documentary films